David Grinnage (born February 4, 1994) is an American football tight end who is a free agent. He played college football for NC State.

College career
Grinnage attended and played college football at NC State.

Collegiate statistics

Professional career

Green Bay Packers
Grinnage signed with Green Bay Packers as an undrafted free agent, but was released three days later on May 11, 2016.

Jacksonville Jaguars
Grinnage was signed by the Jacksonville Jaguars on August 14, 2017. He was waived on September 2, 2017 and was signed to the practice squad the next day. He signed a reserve/future contract with the Jaguars on January 22, 2018.

On September 1, 2018, Grinnage was waived by the Jaguars and was signed to the practice squad the next day. He was promoted to the active roster to replace injured tight end Austin Seferian-Jenkins. Grinnage made his NFL debut and caught his first career pass, a seven-yard reception, on October 14, 2018 in a 40-7 loss to the Dallas Cowboys. He was waived on November 12, 2018.

The Spring League
Grinnage was selected by the Blues of The Spring League in their player selection draft on October 10, 2020.

References

External links
NC State Wolfpack bio

1994 births
Living people
American football tight ends
Players of American football from Delaware
NC State Wolfpack football players
Green Bay Packers players
Jacksonville Jaguars players
People from Newark, Delaware
The Spring League players